The Third Reich is a series of books published by Time Life that chronicles the rise and fall of Nazi Germany. The series began publishing (in the UK) from 1989. Each book focused on a different topic, such as the SS, Afrika Korps and various campaigns. 

They were usually 192 pages in length, heavily illustrated and with pictorial essays on specific topics within the volume. The General Editor for the series was the renowned military historian Col. John R. Elting. There are 21 volumes in the series:

Series of non-fiction books
History books about Nazi Germany
Time Life book series